Carlos Lastarria (27 August 1918 – 19 October 1987) was a Peruvian sports shooter. He competed at the 1960 Summer Olympics and the 1964 Summer Olympics.

References

1918 births
1987 deaths
Peruvian male sport shooters
Olympic shooters of Peru
Shooters at the 1960 Summer Olympics
Shooters at the 1964 Summer Olympics
People from Arequipa
Pan American Games medalists in shooting
Pan American Games silver medalists for Peru
Shooters at the 1959 Pan American Games
20th-century Peruvian people